Enilda is a hamlet in northern Alberta within Big Lakes County, located  west of Highway 49, approximately  northeast of Grande Prairie.

The community's name is that of Adline Tompkins, an early postmaster's wife, spelled backwards.

Demographics 

See also 
List of communities in Alberta
List of designated places in Alberta
List of hamlets in Alberta

References 

Hamlets in Alberta
Designated places in Alberta
Big Lakes County